Sravanthi Ravi Kishore is an Indian film producer known for his works in Telugu cinema. He owns the film production company "Sri Sravanthi Movies", known for presenting hit romantic comedy films. Red was his 30th film production venture, while he had also dubbed 4 films from Tamil into Telugu. He won Nandi Award for Second Best Feature Film - Silver for Nuvve Nuvve (2002)

Filmography
As producer
2021 Red
2017 Vunnadhi Okate Zindagi
2016 Nenu Sailaja
2015 Shivam
2014 Raghuvaran B.Tech
2013 Masala
2012 Endukante... Premanta!
2009 Ganesh Just Ganesh
2008 Ready 
2007 Classmates
2006 Premante Inte
2004 Yuvasena
2004 Gowri
2003 Ela Cheppanu 
2002 Nuvve Nuvve
2001 Nuvvu Naaku Nachav
2000 Nuvve Kavali (Associate Producer)
1999 Manasulo maata
1999 Pilla Nachhindi
1998 Gillikajjalu
1997 Egire Paavurama
1996 Maavichiguru
1995 Lingababu Love Story 
1993 Rowdy mogudu 
1992 Balarama Krishnulu 
1991 Jaitra Yatra
1989 Chal Chal gurramm 
1988 Sister Nandini
1988 Varasudochhadu
1987 Rendu thokala pitta
1987 Nayakudu
1987 Pushpaka Vimanam
1987 Maharshi
1986 Ladies Tailor

References

Telugu film producers
Living people
Year of birth missing (living people)
Film producers from Andhra Pradesh
Indian film producers